Lasioglossum amblypygus, also known as the Lasioglossum (Ctenomia) amblypygus, is a species of bee in the genus Lasioglossum, of the family Halictidae.

References
 https://www.academia.edu/7390502/AN_UPDATED_CHECKLIST_OF_BEES_OF_SRI_LANKA_WITH_NEW_RECORDS
 http://www.cea.lk/web/images/pdf/redlist2012.pdf

Notes

amblypygus
Insects described in 1913